The Sherwood Green House is a property in Williamson County, Tennessee, near Nolensville, that was listed on the National Register of Historic Places in 1988.

It was built c.1810 and had significant developments also in c.1840, and c.1928. It includes Central passage plan and other architecture.

Like the John Motheral House and the William Leaton House (also NRHP-listed in Williamson County), the house was built as a single story log pen building, and was later enlarged to achieve an "imposing" two story frame construction.

The house was expanded and covered with weatherboard in c.1840.  A second story porch with square columns was added then.  A first-floor one-story porch with square Doric-capital posts was added in 1928.

The interior includes a c.1840 stairway with a square newel post and square balusters, and fireplace mantles having simple Greek Revival design with Doric motif pilasters.

Contributing outbuildings include a log kitchen (c.1840) and a log smokehouse (c.1840), both with half dovetail notching, and a slave house (c.1840) later used as a milk house.

Sherwood Green was a surveyor who was paid in land for his services.

References

Central-passage houses in Tennessee
Houses completed in 1810
Houses in Williamson County, Tennessee
Houses on the National Register of Historic Places in Tennessee
National Register of Historic Places in Williamson County, Tennessee